Josia Tim Alexander Topf (born 25 April 2003) is a German Paralympic swimmer who competes in international elite competitions. He is a European bronze medalist and has competed at the 2020 Summer Paralympics but did not medal.

References

External links
 
 

2003 births
Living people
Paralympic swimmers of Germany
Swimmers at the 2020 Summer Paralympics
Medalists at the World Para Swimming Championships
Medalists at the World Para Swimming European Championships
S3-classified Paralympic swimmers
Sportspeople from Erlangen